The 2014–15 season was the 112th in the history of the Southern League, which is an English football competition featuring semi-professional and amateur clubs from the South West, South Central and Midlands of England and South Wales. From the current season onwards, the Southern League is known as Evo-Stik Southern Premier, following a sponsorship deal with Evo-Stik.

Following the liquidation of Premier Division club Hinckley United and the resignation of Thatcham Town from Division One South & West at the end of the season, plus the resignation of Vauxhall Motors from the Conference North, Fleet Town were reprieved from relegation in Division One South & West.

There were subsequently further movements after Worksop Town resigned from the Northern Premier League. Wingate & Finchley had initially been relegated to Isthmian League Division One North, but were readmitted to the Premier Division. Knock-on effects included Ware moving back to the Isthmian after first being placed in the Southern League Division One Central, and Hayes & Yeading United moving to the Southern Premier after initially being placed in the Isthmian Premier. Hayes & Yeading replaced Halesowen Town who had been moved from the Northern to the Southern, and were moved back. Corby Town returned to the Southern after first being placed in the Northern, and Stourbridge moved the other way. Ware were replaced in Division One Central by Bedworth United, who were transferred from the Northern Premier League Division One South.

However, Hayes & Yeading United were once again moved, this time back to the Conference South, when Hereford United were expelled from the Football Conference, and demoted to the Southern Premier.

Premier Division
The Premier Division consisted of 24 clubs, including 17 clubs from the previous season and seven new clubs:
Two clubs promoted from Division One Central:
Dunstable Town
Slough Town

Two clubs promoted from Division One South & West:
Cirencester Town
Paulton Rovers

Plus:
Dorchester Town, relegated from the Conference South
Hereford United, expelled from the Conference Premier and accepted into the Southern League subject to conditions
Histon, relegated from the Conference North

Hereford United F.C. was wound up in the high court in London on 19 December 2014, after it could not be satisfactorily proven that the club's owner had sufficient funding to pay the club's creditors. The main creditor was HM Revenue and Customs. The club's record in the Southern League was officially expunged on 5 January 2015.

League table

Play-offs

Semi-finals

Final

Results

Stadia and locations

Division One Central
Division One Central consisted of 22 clubs, including 18 clubs from previous season and four new clubs:
Bedford Town, relegated from the Premier Division
Bedworth United, transferred from Northern Premier League Division One South
Godalming Town, transferred from Division One South & West
Hanwell Town, promoted from the Spartan South Midlands League

League table

Play-offs

Results

Stadia and locations

Division One South & West
Division One South & West consisted of 22 clubs, including 17 clubs from previous season and five new clubs:
Two clubs relegated from the Premier Division
A.F.C. Totton
Bashley

Plus:
Larkhall Athletic, promoted from the Western League
Sholing, promoted from the Wessex League
Wantage Town, promoted from the Hellenic League

Sholing resigned from the league for ground grading reasons. Clevedon Town were later demoted as their floodlights were not to the required standard. Thus, Bishops Cleeve and Bashley were subsequently reprieved from relegation.

League table

Play-offs

Results

Stadia and locations

League Cup

The Southern League Cup 2014–15 (billed as the RedInsure Cup 2014–15 for sponsorship reasons) is the 77th season of the Southern League Cup , the cup competition of the Southern Football League.

Preliminary round

First round

Second round

Third round

Quarter-finals

Semi-finals

Final

First leg

Second leg

See also
 Southern Football League
 2014–15 Isthmian League
 2014–15 Northern Premier League

References

External links
Official website

Southern Football League seasons
7